The National Democratic Hungarian-Szekler Party (PNDMS) was a political party in Romania.

History
The party began as a political group in early 1919 led by Béla Maurer, and started publishing a daily newspaper Új Világ on 27 April.

In the 1919 elections held between 4 and 8 November, the group won eight seats in the Chamber of Deputies, and four in the Senate. The party itself was officially formed on 27 November in a meeting held at the Grand Hotel in Bucharest, with Lajos Dániel becoming party president. However, it did not contest any further elections.

MPs

Electoral history

Legislative elections

References

Political parties established in 1919
Defunct political parties in Romania
Hungarian political parties in Romania
Regionalist parties in Romania